Greg Madigan (born 24 January 1970) is a former Australian rules footballer who played for  and  in the Australian Football League (AFL) during the 1990s.

Playing mostly at centre half-back, Madigan was a member of Hawthorn's 1989 VFL Grand Final winning side, in only his 6th league game. However, in the subsequent years he failed to establish his position in the Hawthorn team, playing ten or fewer games in each of his six seasons at Hawthorn.

In 1995 he was selected into the inaugural Fremantle Dockers squad with the second selection in the preseason draft.  As one of the few players with AFL experience in the new expansion team, he managed the best season of his career, playing in 18 games.  He remained with Fremantle for two more seasons, but struggled to keep his place, playing only 4 games in each of 1996 and 1997.

When not playing for Fremantle, he represented East Fremantle in the West Australian Football League.

External links

1970 births
Fremantle Football Club players
Hawthorn Football Club players
Hawthorn Football Club Premiership players
East Fremantle Football Club players
Living people
Australian rules footballers from Victoria (Australia)
People educated at Marcellin College, Bulleen
One-time VFL/AFL Premiership players